General elections were held in Mexico on Sunday, 2 July 2006. Voters went to the polls to elect a new President of the Republic to serve a six-year term, replacing then President Vicente Fox (ineligible for re-election under the 1917 Constitution); 500 members of the Chamber of Deputies (300 by the first-past-the-post system and 200 by proportional representation) to serve for three-year terms; and 128 members of the Senate (three per state by limited voting and 32 by proportional representation from national party lists) to serve for six-year terms.

Several local ballots were also held on the same day, including the head and legislature of the federal district, governors of Guanajuato, Jalisco and Morelos and local councillors in several states.

Due to controversial events in Mexican politics in the years preceding the election, the negative and aggressive tone of the presidential campaign, the personal interference of President Vicente Fox to favor the candidate of his party Felipe Calderón, as well as the controversial and close results that gave Calderón a lead of 0.6% of the vote over his rival Andrés Manuel López Obrador (who subsequently refused to recognize the results and claimed that the election had been rigged against him), Mexico went through a political crisis for the remainder of the year, as López Obrador called for protests throughout the country and proclaimed himself to be the "Legitimate President", while legislators of his party protested the inauguration of Felipe Calderón as President on 1 December. At the same time, the southern state of Oaxaca was marked by severe civil unrest during 2006 after a teachers' strike was violently repressed by Governor Ulises Ruiz Ortiz, which led to protests calling for his resignation; the 2 July elections in many regions of that state were disturbed by the ongoing conflict.

Although there were nationwide protests by López Obrador's supporters calling for a complete recount of the votes, this was rejected by the Federal Electoral Tribunal, which only authorized a recount in less than 10% of the polling stations and later concluded that the irregularities in the election hadn't been grave enough to change the outcome of the election. On 5 September, Calderón was officially declared by the Tribunal as the winner of the election.

Analysts agree that Calderón's launch of the Mexican Drug War on 11 December (only ten days after taking office as President) was an extraordinary step to gain popular support and to cement his legitimacy in the aftermath of the convoluted elections and the subsequent crisis.

Presidential candidates
There were five registered candidates for the 2006 presidential election:

A non-registered candidate, Víctor González Torres (nicknamed "Dr. Simi" after the mascot of his national drugstore franchise) made a massive marketing campaign to enter the election, in spite of not being registered as an official candidate, and ran as a write-in candidate. His popular slogan was "The same only cheaper", but his campaign slogan was "To serve God and the people of Mexico". Ironically, he frequently stressed the fact that he paid all of his own campaign expenses, thus being the "cheapest" candidate. He was not considered a formal candidate but many press sources still publish his sayings and complaints against IFE, while some sources consider him a sort of "comic relief".

Assets, liabilities and annual expenses
As of January 2005, only three candidates had made a public declaration of assets, liabilities and annual expenses. These figures were given in pesos, the total value of assets of each candidate follows at an exchange rate of 10.62 pesos to one United States dollar (Source: Banamex):

Debates
A first presidential debate was held on 25 April 2006 with the presence of all candidates with the notable exception of López Obrador. López Obrador had refused to participate in all debates, and said he would only participate in one since long before the first debate was scheduled. The rest of the candidates agreed on leaving an empty chair to symbolize that the fifth candidate was indeed invited.

The silla vacía (Spanish for "empty chair") became the topic of political commentary shows and the press. Excélsior called the empty chair a "double-edged sword" coinciding with other publications and TV shows that leaving the empty chair could be construed as an insult to the audience and an attack to López Obrador. However, by the date of the debates, the statistical tendency in many polls had confirmed Calderón at the second spot and López Obrador still with a single digit advantage over him.

After the first debate some political commentators, media outlets, and polls indicated that Calderón was seen as the winner of the debate, Mercado as the pleasant surprise of the night. and a nervous Madrazo as the worst performer of the night. However, political analysts also said that the debate was unnecessarily full of promises and personal attacks. Analysts considered that López Obrador was negatively affected by his absence and polls later confirmed Calderón having replaced López Obrador as the leading candidate.

A second debate took place on 6 June of the same year, from 20:30 to 22:30, Central Time, with the confirmed presence of all candidates, including López Obrador. Media outlets have given results to telephone polls applied post-debate showing a mixed tendency. Most, like Reforma and Presente, gave Felipe Calderón the lead, but a few, like Diario Monitor, gave it to Andrés Manuel López Obrador.

However, the rise of López Obrador in voter preference polls since the debate seems to indicate that it was the PRD candidate who won it. One of the main causes for this victory may have been the Hildebrando accusation that López Obrador made during the debate.

Before the debate, Carlos Ahumada's wife threatened to release tapes involving allies of López Obrador in suspected acts of corruption, but the release was cancelled due to an attempted murder which is still under investigation. (See: Videoscandals).

Victor González Torres, a national pharmacy entrepreneur nicknamed "Dr. Simi", declared himself a non-registered write-in candidate and tried to enter the building where the debate was to take place. González Torres demanded to be allowed participation in the debate, but he was not allowed to enter the building where he made the demand. He even brought his own chair. Candidates with no political parties are not permitted to compete in elections under Mexican law, and votes for all write-in candidates are counted together, regardless of which write-in candidate the vote was cast.

On 13 June 2006 all political parties, except Nueva Alianza, signed before members of the IFE the Democratic Agreement for the Equality, Legality and Gobernability, in which the main purpose was that everyone agree on a compromise to respect the results of the election.

Opinion polls
Opinion polls in the run-up to the election showed López Obrador and Calderón neck and neck. The last polls conducted before the polling blackout that begins eight days before the election all showed López Obrador and Calderón tied with the results within the margins of error. Both Reforma and El Universal newspapers, considered by many to be Mexico City's most influential, gave López Obrador a two-point edge over Calderón.

The candidates of the smaller parties also gained ground at the expense of Roberto Madrazo and López Obrador. The last poll from El Universal showed Patricia Mercado of Social Democratic and Farmer Alternative had gained enough support for her party to retain its registry.  In the latest Zogby poll, Madrazo, however, trailed the leader Calderón by only 8 points and was only 4 points behind López Obrador.

Averaging the last ten polls conducted before the polling blackout (between 20 June and 23 June), López Obrador edged out Calderón by a razor-thin half percentage point with 35.1%. Calderón had 34.6% and Madrazo came in third with 26%.

* Polls conducted by Arcop (published in Milenio and showed the first lead of Calderón over López Obrador) and Covarrubias (published in La Jornada, and the one that showed the highest lead of López Obrador) are internal polls, and generally not as reliable as the others.

Conduct

Results

President
On July 6, 2006 the Federal Electoral Institute (IFE) announced the final vote count in the 2006 presidential election, resulting in a narrow margin of 0.58 percentage points of victory for Felipe Calderón Hinojosa (PAN). Calderon's victory was confirmed by the Federal courts on September 5, 2006, and he was declared President-elect of Mexico. However, Andrés Manuel López Obrador (PRD), and his party, alleged irregularities in over 30% of the country's polling stations, and still after an unsuccessful judicial appeal of election results the PRD continued to call for street protests.details

Quick count
The IFE declared at 11:00 pm on July 2, 2006 that the statistics yielded by the official quick count indicated that the presidential election was too close to call, meaning that the difference between the two front-runners was smaller than their margin of error, or 0.3% of the vote. The IFE further declared that the official count, which began on Wednesday, July 5, 2006, was to determine which candidate would be recognized as president elect.

Nevertheless, front-running presidential candidates Felipe Calderón Hinojosa (PAN) and Andrés Manuel López Obrador (PRD) declared themselves the winners, basing their speeches on a number of private exit-polls, some quoted and some not quoted, that gave a lead within the margin of error. PAN chairman Manuel Espino Barrientos requested that IFE declare a winner by the night of July 3, 2006.

Preliminary results clearly showed that PRI-PVEM candidate Roberto Madrazo did not have a realistic chance of winning the presidency. Those results also showed that the smaller parties (Nueva Alianza and Alternativa Socialdemócrata y Campesina) would retain their registration.

The so-called "foreign vote", whereby for the first time Mexican citizens living abroad were allowed to vote, albeit solely in the presidential contest, totalled only slightly more than 32,000 voters. The overall turn-out for this election was approximately 59% of the eligible voters.

Preliminary Electoral Results Program
The Preliminary Electoral Results Program (Programa de Resultados Electorales Preliminares, or PREP) is mandated by law to provide a quick estimate of the electoral results, but it has no authority to determine the outcome of the election.

This point was made repeatedly by IFE President Ugalde in his official statements as the 2006 electoral process unfolded.
The use of the PREP has been criticized because its data has been used by one candidate to proclaim his victory and by the other as supposed evidence of fraud. However, the PREP tends to predict the winner accurately when the difference between candidates is more than 1% (a condition that was not met in this election).

IFE information coordinator René Miranda dismissed PRD allegations that the changes in PREP's numbers were statistically improbable, saying the PREP was used objectively and impartially to "reflect the reality of the country".

Official count
After the PREP was concluded on 4 July, the official district-based counts were begun on Wednesday 5 July 2006.  In accordance with the Federal Code of Electoral Procedures and Institutions (COFIPE), each of Mexico's 300 congressional districts tabulated the votes recorded on the tally sheets (the "actas") for each voting precinct in their district. "In some cases, such as when a tally sheet was illegible, the sealed ballot packets were opened and recounted." All under the eyes of any election observers that any political party cared to provide.

The district committee results, along with the ballots, were then transferred to the IFE in Mexico City, which resulted in the running total shown below. Early returns favored López Obrador, but by 04:07 Mexico City time, Calderón overtook him.
By 07:45, Calderón was leading by approximately 0.33% of the vote.

The volatility in the vote count was not unexpected. From the beginning, the IFE stated that running totals should not be construed as a trend, and that the official result would be released only when all polling stations had been counted.  Several northern states, which strongly favored the PAN party in the PREP results, were slow in counting their ballots. This delay was at least partially attributable to the double-checking of district station totals with the actual ballot counts,
that any political party may ask for under Mexican law.

On 6 July, having narrowly lost the preliminary official count, López Obrador declared his intent
to challenge the results before the Federal Electoral Tribunal (TEPJF), and demand a full recount of all ballots in Mexico City. On 8 July, his supporters met at Mexico City's Zócalo square to start what Obrador called "the defense of the popular vote".  The PRD also made a presentation on alleged election irregularities, including (as reported in La Jornada), allegations that around 7:00 PM, the IFE's running scoreboard vote tally blinked zero for all candidates for a period of 4 minutes.

The election-inspired protests were largely peaceful, and according to former IFE president José Woldenberg, well within the law.  However some unions and PRD supporters called for "civil resistance" if the courts decided to ratify Calderón's victory.  Some, like editorialist Armando Fuentes Aguirre, expressed concern that this could lead to armed conflict.

On 5 September 2006 the Federal Electoral Court declared Calderón the definitive winner.

The final vote tally of the top two candidates was Calderón 15,000,284, López Obrador 14,756,350, a difference of 243,934.

Election monitors from the European Union stated on 8 July that they found no irregularities that could have affected the transparency of the results and that could have impacted the results. Other election monitors found many examples of fraud and irregularities and demanded a full recount . See also: Controversies of the 2006 Mexican general election

Earlier media reports had indicated that in two separate incidents, one in Ciudad Nezahualcóyotl and one in Xalapa, used ballots and other electoral materials were found in rubbish dumps. Reforma later reported that this supposed electoral material was found to be photocopies and did not influence the election. Al Giordano, though, in a July 8 Narco News article, has a La Jornada photo of three completed color ballots found in a Mexico City trash can.

By state

Senate

Chamber of Deputies

Aftermath

Demands for a recount

Soon after it was clear that the official count would result with Felipe Calderón ahead, Andrés Manuel López Obrador stated that he and his party, the PRD, would fight for a "vote-by-vote" general recount.

He presented nine boxes and 900 pages of supposed evidence alleging mathematical electoral irregularities in 50,000 polling places to the Federal Electoral Tribunal (TEPJF). In addition, he claimed that in areas with large numbers of López Obrador supporters, election officials nullified 900,000 votes.

López Obrador and his supporters began organizing mass protests, marches, and civil disobedience, culminating in a massive rally in Mexico City's historic Zócalo on 30 July 2006. Estimates of the crowd at the rally range from 500,000 to 3,000,000 supporters. Additionally, López Obrador's campaign set up plantones, or encampments, inside the Zócalo and along Paseo de la Reforma, one of Mexico City's main arteries, for 47 days and slowing traffic for hours. The encampments were widely unpopular, as 65% of inhabitants in Mexico City opposed them.

On Saturday, 5 August, the TEPJF met in public session to decide the outcome of López Obrador's request for a recount. The seven magistrates voted unanimously that there was only sufficient legal justification to order the recount of 11,839 ballot boxes in 155 districts (9.2% of the total), thus rejecting López Obrador's public demand that all votes and ballot boxes be recounted.  The Tribunal based its decision of a partial recount on its finding that, despite publicly demanding a vote by vote general recount, López Obrador's party only presented legal claims to less than 44,000 polling stations, or less than 34%. Therefore, legally, only those 44,000 polling stations were deemed controversial by the TEPJF. The Tribunal ruled that the non-controversial votes should not be recounted, because "the certainty asked by the Coalition (of López Obrador's party) is tied to the respect of the citizen counts in non-controversial polling stations". However, the Tribunal did certify that principles of certainty in the elections called for a justified recount in some of the controversial stations, as irregularities were found.

In the western state of Jalisco alone, 2,705 ballot boxes (33% of the state's total) will be recounted due to "evident mathematical errors". The state with the highest percentage of ballot boxes to be reopened is Aguascalientes with 436 or 35% of its 1,226 total ballot boxes. Other states with a high percentage of ballot boxes authorized to be opened include:
Tamaulipas, 942 ballot boxes (or 23.7% of total ballot boxes); Campeche, 170 (18.3%); Chihuahua, 727 (15%); Durango, 344 (15.4%); Nuevo León, 508 (10%); San Luis Potosí, 495 (16%); Sinaloa, 334 (7.7%); Yucatán, 228 (10.5%); Zacatecas, 221 (9.23%); Querétaro, 9.4%.

States with small percentages include: Chiapas, 81 ballot boxes (1.6%); Distrito Federal, 227 (1.85%); Estado de México, 362 (2.33%); Michoacán, 300 (5.5%); Morelos, 124 (6%); Puebla, 194 (3.22%); Veracruz, 396 (6.56%); and Quintana Roo, 10 (0.8%).

The recount commenced on Wednesday, 9 August, (CBC) (VOA) and concluded on Sunday, 13 August. Only after calculating the recounted votes will the TEPJF declare the candidate with the most votes as president-elect.

On Friday, August 11, both disputing parties held press conferences, in which, despite the TEPJF's insistence that no recount results would be released until Sunday, each provided their own internal figures based on their observers in the recount. These figures clashed dramatically; according to the PAN, 75% of the votes had been recounted and the results confirmed that the initial count was "perfect", with fewer than three errors per ballot box and no systemic bias. (This is the message that most of the press reported, although others reported that the "75% without errors" figure was out of the completed, not the total, recount; still, the figures were hard to square with Coalition claims.) The Coalition claimed that only 60% of the recount was complete, and that in this recount their party had gained an average of 29 votes per ballot box. (Again, this was the message in most of the press, though other press outlets seemed to imply that the Coalition claims included lost or excess ballots as well as miscounted ones.).  

On August 28, the TEPJF announced the results of the partial recount, subtracting 81,080 votes for Calderón, 76,897 votes for López Obrador, 63,114 for Roberto Madrazo, 5,962 for Patricia Mercado, 2,743 for Roberto Campa, and 7,940 for the remaining candidates. A total of 237,736 votes were annulled out of the approximately 4 million votes recounted. That means around 6% of the recounted votes were annulled.

Despite the Tribunal's ruling, and despite the ruling being based on his party's decision of not contesting all polls judicially, López Obrador continues to demand the "vote-by-vote" general recount, promising to continue civil disobedience and sit-ins. He was quoted as saying, "We don't want a portion of democracy. We want 100% democracy." 

A day before the end of the recount, López Obrador's coalition threatened with national mobilizations to prevent the "imposition" of Calderón, if the PAN candidate was confirmed the winner of the election.

Calls for electoral reform
On Thursday November 23, 2006 the European Union (EU) election observer mission presented its final report. The report was generally positive and defended the official result of the July 2 presidential election saying they "reflect[ed] the legitimate will of the Mexican people." However, the report also expressed concerns and raised several criticisms, both general and specific, of the electoral process and the election. The report includes 48 specific recommendations for future reform to "strengthen the electoral process", such as introducing random automatic recounts in the case of a close election, shortening the campaign period, considering the introduction of a two round run-off system for presidential elections, and general clarifications in the electoral law (e.g., clarifying the grounds for requesting a recount and for the annulling of the election).

A November 24, 2006 article by The Herald Mexico reports: "All of Mexico's major parties have called for reforms to electoral laws, including clearer limits on funding, greater transparency on campaign spending and a shorter campaign period."

The article also reports: "The EU mission, headed by Spanish Deputy José Ignacio Salafranca, said on Thursday that a runoff election would help the nation's electoral system, especially following results as close as this year's, when Felipe Calderón beat Andrés Manuel López Obrador by less than a percentage point. In a news conference, Salafranca said that while a second round would be expensive, it would give 'greater democratic legitimacy' to the result."

Subsequent political crisis
The high degree of controversy and polarization that resulted from this election gave way to a grave political crisis in Mexico throughout 2006. The elections were more controversial than those of 1988, and in a symbolic act, on 20 November López Obrador organized a ceremony to take office as the "Legitimate President of Mexico", followed by his sympathizers.

Calderón's inauguration ceremony on 1 December at the Congress of the Union was tense and lasted less than five minutes, as he barely managed to recite the oath of office while the PRD legislators shouted in protest against the alleged electoral fraud and attempted to impede his inauguration, and afterward he quickly left the building for security reasons as some of the legislators engaged in violent brawls. Besides the claims of fraud, Calderón took office with the smallest percentage of votes for a winning presidential candidate in Mexican history (35.8%), which meant that his administration would face severe legitimacy problems. Only a month after taking office, Calderón declared war on the drug cartels and organized crime, thus beginning the Mexican Drug War. This was considered by many as an immediate strategy to gain popular legitimacy and acceptance for the new President after the convoluted elections.

The 2006 elections remain a point of controversy and discussion. López Obrador, who ran for the presidency again in 2012 before finally winning the presidency on his third try in 2018, has always considered himself as the legitimate winner of this election even after all political parties, except Nueva Alianza, signed before members of the IFE on June 13, 2006 the Democratic Agreement for the Equality, Legality and Gobernability in which the main purpose was that everyone agree on a compromise to respect the election results.

Filmmaker Luis Mandoki produced a documentary titled "Fraude: México 2006", in which he chronicles many events of the second half of Vicente Fox's administration that led up to the heated 2006 election, and highlights the irregularities that took place during the process. The film has a duration of 110 minutes and topped the Mexican box office upon its 2007 debut.

In a 2011 opinion poll published by El País about whether the 2006 elections had been fraudulent, 49% of the respondents believed that the election was rigged, against 43% who believed it wasn't rigged and 8% who were unsure.

In 2017, PRI member and former governor of Coahuila, Humberto Moreira accused Calderón of "stealing the Presidency" in 2006. In October 2018, Roberto Madrazo, who was the 2006 PRI presidential candidate, stated in an interview that according to the data he received after the election, López Obrador had been the winner.

Mexican sociologist Jacqueline Peschard has identified the "breakdown in consensus that nearly resulted" because of this election as a major turning point in the history of Mexico as a functioning and legitimate liberal democracy.

See also
List of controversial elections

Footnotes

External links
What's at stake in Mexico's election? Socialist Worker
Preliminary election results, this is a constantly updated count of actual ballots as they are tallied into the electoral system. Not a survey, these are actual results.
Opinion pieces on the election Link to the Council on Hemispheric Affairs, a think tank that has covered the 2006 presidential elections from Mexico.
An Analysis of Mexico's Recounted Ballots  Issue Brief by the Center for Economic and Policy Research, August 2006.
Mexico 2006 Panel Study

Mexico
General
July 2006 events in North America
Legislative elections in Mexico